Matthias Staudacher born 11th January of 1963 is a German theoretical physicist who has done significant work in the area of quantum field theory and string theory.

Education
Beginning his physics studies at the University of Heidelberg and at Ludwig Maximilian University of Munich, Staudacher then earned a Ph.D. at the University of Illinois at Urbana-Champaign (1990) with a dissertation on matrix models of two-dimensional quantum gravity.

After postdoctoral work at Rutgers University in New Jersey, Paris and CERN in Geneva, from 1997 he was a researcher at the Max Planck Institute for Gravitational Physics (Albert Einstein Institute) in Potsdam. In 2009 he received the Academy Award of the Berlin-Brandenburg Academy of Sciences and Humanities and became a mathematical physics professor at Humboldt University of Berlin in 2010. Some of his publications have been instrumental in developing an understanding of the so-called AdS/CFT correspondence, a duality between the Yang-Mills-type quantum theory and supersymmetric string theory first suggested in the 1990s by Juan Martín Maldacena. Staudacher suggests that the integrable spin chains of condensed matter physics may form the link between the two approaches.

Selected publications
 1997 – V. A. Kazakov and M. Staudacher, "Advances in Large N Group Theory and the Solution of Two-Dimensional R² Gravity", pp. 265–277 in Low-dimensional applications of Quantum field theory, Laurent Baulieu, Vladimir Kazakov, Marco Picco, Paul Windey (Eds.) Plenum Press, New York.

See also
 
 Interview in journal HU-WISSEN Edition 6, December 2013 jointly with Jan Plefka.
 Matthias Staudacher at Humboldt University

Notes

21st-century German physicists
Living people
Heidelberg University alumni
University of Illinois Urbana-Champaign alumni
Theoretical physicists
Year of birth missing (living people)
People associated with CERN